Rani Parvati Devi Deskit Wangmo is the Queen mother of Ladakh and a former member of the 6th Lok Sabha (1977–80).

Early life
Parvati was born on 1 May 1934 at the Khangsar Palace into the Royal House of Khangsar, the greatest royal house of Lahaul, presently part of  Lahaul and Spiti district of Himachal Pradesh to Nyima Wangyal. She received education up to fifth standard.

Career
Parvati Devi is known for her social work in Ladakh. In 1958 she became the Convener of Welfare Extension Project, Leh's Implementing Committee.

For the 1977 Indian general election, the Indian National Congress (INC) made Devi its candidate for Ladakh constituency and its local coalition partner Jammu & Kashmir National Conference supported her. Only an independent candidate stood against her and she defeated him by a margin of 2,877 votes (polling 23,130 against his 20,253) to become the first woman MP from Ladakh. Devi and Begum Akbar Jehan Abdullah were the only Jammu & Kashmir women to win the 1977 election. The house couldn't complete its term of five years and in 1980 another election was held. This time National Conference fielded its candidate from Ladakh.

She's the founder and president of Namgyal Institute of Research on Ladakhi Art and Culture (NIRLAC).

Personal life
Parvati married the titular king of Ladakh, Kunzang Namgyal on 10 July 1950, who turned out to be an alcoholic and died at the age of 48, leaving behind Devi and their four children (two sons and two daughters). As per local traditions she was supposed to marry the deceased king's brother. Instead she excluded her brother-in-law from the family and arranged a monthly allowance for him. He took the matter to the court and eventually, in an out-of-court settlement, gained possession of a part of the family property.

She resides at the Stok Palace, which also serves as a museum. During winters, she sojourns in Manali.

References

1934 births
Living people
People from Lahaul and Spiti district
India MPs 1977–1979
Women members of the Lok Sabha
Ladakhi people
Lok Sabha members from Jammu and Kashmir
People from Ladakh
20th-century Indian women
20th-century Indian people